The enlargement of the eurozone is an ongoing process within the European Union (EU). All member states of the European Union, except Denmark which negotiated an opt-out from the provisions, are obliged to adopt the euro as their sole currency once they meet the criteria, which include: complying with the debt and deficit criteria outlined by the Stability and Growth Pact, keeping inflation and long-term governmental interest rates below certain reference values, stabilising their currency's exchange rate versus the euro by participating in the European Exchange Rate Mechanism (ERM II), and ensuring that their national laws comply with the ECB statute, ESCB statute and articles 130+131 of the Treaty on the Functioning of the European Union. The obligation for EU member states to adopt the euro was first outlined by article 109.1j of the Maastricht Treaty of 1992, which became binding on all new member states by the terms of their treaties of accession.

, there are 20 EU member states in the eurozone, of which the first 11 (Austria, Belgium, Finland, France, Germany, Ireland, Italy, Luxembourg, the Netherlands, Portugal and Spain) introduced the euro on 1 January 1999 when it was electronic only. Greece joined 1 January 2001, one year before the physical euro coins and notes replaced the old national currencies in the eurozone. Subsequently, the following eight countries also joined the eurozone on 1 January in the mentioned year: Slovenia (2007), Cyprus (2008), Malta (2008), Slovakia (2009), Estonia (2011), Latvia (2014), Lithuania (2015) and Croatia (2023).

Six remaining states are on the enlargement agenda: Bulgaria, Czechia, Hungary, Poland, Romania and Sweden. Bulgaria and Denmark participate in ERM II, though Denmark has opted out of joining the eurozone and is therefore not obliged to do so. The United Kingdom also had an opt-out until it left the EU on 31 January 2020, though it never joined the ERM II either.

Accession procedure

All EU members which have joined the bloc since the signing of the Maastricht Treaty in 1992 are legally obliged to adopt the euro once they meet the criteria, since the terms of their accession treaties make the provisions on the euro binding on them. In order for a state to formally join the eurozone, enabling them to mint euro coins and get a seat at the European Central Bank (ECB) and the Eurogroup, a country must be a member of the European Union and comply with five convergence criteria, which were initially defined by the Maastricht Treaty in 1992. These criteria include: complying with the debt and deficit criteria outlined by the Stability and Growth Pact, keeping inflation and long-term governmental interest rates below reference values, and stabilising their currency's exchange rate versus the euro. Generally, it is expected that the last point will be demonstrated by two consecutive years of participation in the European Exchange Rate Mechanism (ERM II), though according to the Commission "exchange rate stability during a period of non-participation before entering ERM II can be taken into account." The country must also ensure that their national laws are compliant with the ECB statute, ESCB statute and articles 130+131 of the Treaty on the Functioning of the European Union.

Since the convergence criteria require participation in the ERM, and non-eurozone states are responsible for deciding when to join ERM, they can ultimately control when they adopt the euro by staying outside the ERM and thus deliberately failing to meet the convergence criteria until they wish to. In some non-eurozone states without an opt-out, there has been discussion about holding referendums on approving their euro adoption. Of the 16 states which have acceded to EU since 1992, the only state to have staged a euro referendum to date is Sweden, which in 2003 rejected its government's proposal to adopt the euro in 2006.

Convergence criteria
The convergence progress for the newly accessed EU member states, is supported and evaluated by the yearly submission of the "Convergence programme" under the Stability and Growth Pact. As a general rule, the majority of economic experts recommend for newly accessed EU member states with a forecasted era of catching up and a past record of "macroeconomic imbalance" or "financial instability", that these countries first use some years to address these issues and ensure "stable convergence", before taking the next step to join the ERM II, and as the final step (when complying with all convergence criteria) ultimately adopt the euro. In practical terms, any non-euro EU member state can become an ERM II member whenever they want, as this mechanism does not define any criteria to comply with. Economists however consider it to be more desirable for "unstable countries", to maintain their flexibility of having a floating currency, rather than getting an inflexible and partly fixed currency as an ERM II member. Only at the time of being considered fully "stable", the member states will be encouraged to enter into ERM II, in which they need to stay for a minimum of two years without presence of "severe tensions" for their currency, while at the same time also ensuring compliance with the other four convergence criteria, before finally being approved to adopt the euro.

Reference values for the HICP criteria and interest rate criteria
The compliance check above was conducted in June 2014, with the HICP and interest rate reference values specifically applying for the last assessment month with available data (April 2014). As reference values for HICP and interest rates are subject for monthly changes, any EU member state with a euro derogation has the right to ask for a renewed compliance check at any time during the year. For this potential extra assessment, the table below feature Eurostat's monthly publication of values being used in the calculation process to determine the reference value (upper limit) for HICP inflation and long-term interest rates, where a certain fixed buffer value is added to the moving unweighted arithmetic average of the three EU Member States with the lowest HICP inflation rates (ignoring states classified as "outliers").

The black values in the table are sourced by the officially published convergence reports, while the lime-green values are only qualified estimates, not confirmed by any official convergence report but sourced by monthly estimation reports published by the Polish Ministry of Finance. The reason why the lime-green values are only estimates is that the "outlier" selection (ignoring certain states from the reference value calculation) besides depending on a quantitative assessment also depends on a more complicated overall qualitative assessment, and hence it can not be predicted with absolute certainty which of the states the commission will deem to be outliers. So any selection of outliers by the lime-green data lines shall only be regarded as qualified estimates, which potentially could be different from those outliers which the commission would have selected if they had published a specific report at the concerned point of time.

The national fiscal accounts for the previous full calendar year are released each year in April (next time 24 April 2019). As the compliance check for both the debt and deficit criteria always awaits this release in a new calendar year, the first possible month to request a compliance check will be April, which would result in a data check for the HICP and interest rates during the reference year from 1 April to 31 March. Any EU member state may also ask the European Commission to conduct a compliance check, at any point of time during the remainder of the year, with HICP and interest rates always checked for the past 12 months – while debt and deficit compliance always will be checked for the three-year period encompassing the last completed full calendar year and the two subsequent forecast years. As of 10 August 2015, none of the remaining euro derogation states without an opt-out had entered ERM II, which makes it highly unlikely that any of them will request that the European Commission conduct an extraordinary compliance check ahead of the publication of the next regular convergence report scheduled June 2016.

Additional requirements
In the wake of the financial crisis, Eurozone governments have sought to apply additional requirements on acceding countries. Bulgaria, initially aiming to join the Banking union of the European Union after its ERM accession agreed to enter into closer cooperation with it simultaneously to joining ERM II, requiring its banks to first undergo stress tests. Bulgaria also agreed to reinforce supervision of the non-bank financial sector and fully implement EU anti money-laundering rules. While the reforms from the Cooperation and Verification Mechanism (which applies only to Bulgaria and Romania) were also expected, leaving the CVM is not a precondition.

Changeover plan
Each country aspiring to adopt the euro has been requested by the European Commission to develop a "strategy for criteria compliance" and "national euro changeover plan". In the "changeover plan", the country can select from between three scenarios for euro adoption:
 Madrid scenario 
 Big-bang scenario 
 Big-bang scenario with phaseout 
The second scenario is recommended for candidate countries, while the third is only advised if at a late stage in the preparational process they experience technical difficulties (i.e. with IT systems), which would make an extended transitional period for the phasing out of the old currency at the legal level a necessity. The European Commission has published a handbook detailing how states should prepare for the changeover. It recommends that a national steering committee is established at a very early stage of the state's preparation process, with the task to outline detailed plans for the following five actions:
 Prepare the public with an information campaign and dual price display.
 Prepare the public sector's introduction at the legal level.
 Prepare the private sector's introduction at the legal level.
 Prepare the vending machine industry so that they can deliver adjusted and quality tested vending machines.
 Frontload banks as well as public and private retail sectors several months (no earlier than 4 months) ahead of the euro adoption day, with their needed supply of euro coins and notes.
The table below summarises each candidate country's national plan for euro adoption and currency changeover.

Alternative proposals
The European microstates of Andorra, Monaco, San Marino, and the Vatican City are not covered by convergence criteria, but by special monetary agreements that allow them to issue their own euro coins. However, they have no input into the economic affairs of the euro. In 2009 the authors of a confidential International Monetary Fund (IMF) report suggested that in light of the ongoing global financial crisis, the EU Council should consider granting EU member states which are having difficulty complying with all five convergence criteria the option to "partially adopt" the euro, along the lines of the monetary agreements signed with the microstates outside the EU. These states would gain the right to adopt the euro and issue a national variant of euro coins, but would not get a seat in ECB or the Eurogroup until they met all the convergence criteria. However, the EU has not agreed to this alternative accession process.

Historical enlargements

The eurozone was born with its first 11 member states on 1 January 1999. The first enlargement of the eurozone, to Greece, took place on 1 January 2001, one year before the euro had physically entered into circulation. Along with the formal eurozone states, the euro also replaced currencies in four microstates, Kosovo, and Montenegro, all of whom used currencies replaced by the euro. Denmark and Sweden held referendums on joining the eurozone, but voters voted down the referendums leading both to remain outside. The first enlargements after the euro entered into circulation were to states which joined the EU in 2004; namely Slovenia in 2007, Cyprus and Malta in 2008, Slovakia in 2009, Estonia in 2011, Latvia in 2014, and Lithuania in 2015. On 1 January 2023 Croatia, which had joined the EU in 2013, became the 20th member of the eurozone.

Exchange-rate regime for EU members
The chart below provides a full historical summary of exchange-rate regimes for EU members since the European Monetary System with its Exchange Rate Mechanism and the related new common currency ECU was born on 13 March 1979. The euro replaced the ECU 1:1 at the exchange rate markets, on 1 January 1999. During 1979–1999, the German mark functioned as a de facto anchor for the ECU, meaning there was only a minor difference between pegging a currency against ECU and pegging it against the German mark.

Future enlargements
All members who joined the union from 1995 onwards are required by treaty to adopt the euro as soon as they meet the criteria; only Denmark obtained treaty opt-outs from participation in the Maastricht Treaty when the euro was agreed upon. For the others, the single currency was a requirement of EU membership.

Bulgaria

On 30 April 2020, Bulgaria officially applied to join ERM II, the first step to introduce the euro.  Since 10 July 2020, the lev has been part of ERM II, pegged to the euro at a fixed rate of €1 = BGN 1.95583. Previous to that, since the launch of the euro in 1999, it had been pegged to the euro at the same rate through a strictly managed currency board. In all of the three latest annual assessment reports, Bulgaria managed to comply with four out of the five economic convergence criteria for euro adoption, only failing to comply with the criteria requiring the currency of the state to have been a stable ERM II member for a minimum of two years. The former chief inspector of the Bulgarian National Bank, Kolyo Paramov, in office when the currency board of the state was established, believes that adoption of the euro soon would "trigger a number of positive economic effects": Sufficient money supply (leading to increased lending which is needed to improve economic growth), getting rid of the currency board which prevents the national bank functioning as a lender of last resort to rescue banks in financial troubles, and finally private and public lending would benefit from lower interest rates (at least half as high).

Before 2015 it had been government policy to hold-off application until the European sovereign-debt crisis had resolved but with the election of Boyko Borisov, Bulgaria began pursuing membership. In January 2015, Finance Minister Vladislav Goranov aimed to apply during the current government. He began talks with the Eurogroup and established a co-ordination council to prepare for membership. Following the 2017 parliamentary elections Borisov's government was re-elected. Borisov stated that he intended to apply to join ERM II but Goranov elaborated that the government would only seek to join once the eurozone states were ready to approve the application, and that he expected to have clarity of this by the end of 2017. On taking the presidency of the Council of the European Union in January 2018, Prime Minister Boyko Borisov indicated no clarification had been given but announced he was going to pursue applications for both ERM II and Schengen by July regardless. Bulgaria sent a letter to the Eurogroup at the end of June on its desire to participate in ERM II, and issued a commitment to enter into a "close cooperation" agreement with the Banking union of the European Union that July.

In July 2019 some extra conditions were requested by Eurozone governments, namely that Bulgaria;
Join the Banking union of the European Union at the same time as ERM (meaning Bulgaria's banks must first pass stress-tests).
Reinforce supervision of the non-bank financial sector and fully implement EU anti money-laundering rules.
Thoroughly implement the reforms from the Cooperation and Verification Mechanism (CVM).

While the CVM reforms are mentioned, and progress in judicial reform and organised crime is expected, leaving the CVM is not a precondition.

According a statement by former Finance Minister Vladislav Goranov in December 2019, Bulgaria expected to join ERM II by July 2020 and to adopt the euro by 1 January 2024. Bulgaria joined ERM II on 10 July 2020. On 17 February 2023, Finance Minister Rositsa Velkova announced that Bulgaria will not join the Eurozone on 1 January 2024, and that the new target date for the entry into the euro area would be 1 January 2025.

Czech Republic 

Following their accession to the EU in May 2004, the Czech Republic aimed to replace the koruna with the euro in 2010, however this was postponed indefinitely. The European sovereign-debt crisis further decreased the Czech Republic's interest in joining the eurozone. There were calls for a referendum before adopting the euro, with former Prime Minister Petr Nečas saying that the conditions had significantly changed since their accession treaty was ratified. President Miloš Zeman also supported a referendum, but did still advocate adoption of the euro.

Adoption was supported under Prime Minister Bohuslav Sobotka but supported a recommendation from the Czech National Bank to refrain from setting a target date. The government agreed that if it was re-elected in 2017 then it would agree a roadmap for adoption by 2020, however the election was lost to Andrej Babiš who had been against euro adoption in the near-term. Babiš's successor Petr Fiala and his cabinet, formed after the 2021 legislative election, maintained the predecessor cabinets' intention not to adopt the euro, calling the adoption "disadvantageous" for the Czechs.

Denmark

Denmark has pegged its krone to the euro at €1 = DKK 7.46038 ± 2.25% through the ERM II since it replaced the original ERM on 1 January 1999. During negotiations of the Maastricht Treaty of 1992, Denmark secured a protocol which gave it the right to decide if and when they would join the euro. Denmark subsequently notified the Council of the European Communities of their decision to opt out of the euro. This was done in response to the Maastricht Treaty having been rejected by the Danish people in a referendum earlier that year. As a result of the changes, the treaty was ratified in a subsequent referendum held in 1993. On 28 September 2000, a euro referendum was held in Denmark resulting in a 53.2% vote against the government's proposal to join the euro.

Since 2007, the Danish government has discussed holding another referendum on euro adoption. However the political and financial uncertainty due to the European government-debt crisis led this to be postponed. Opinion polls, which had generally favoured euro adoption from 2002 to 2010, showed a rapid decline in support during the height of the EU debt crisis, reaching a low in May 2012 with 26% in favour towards 67% against while 7% were in doubt.

Hungary

With their accession to the EU in 2004, Hungary began planning to adopt the euro in place of the forint. However, the country's high deficit delayed this. After the 2006 election, Prime Minister Ferenc Gyurcsány introduced austerity measures, reducing the deficit to less than 5% in 2007 from 9.2%. In February 2011, newly elected Prime Minister Viktor Orbán, of the soft eurosceptic Fidesz party, made clear that he did not expect the euro to be adopted in Hungary before 1 January 2020. Orbán said the country was not yet ready to adopt the currency and they will not discuss the possibility until the public debt reaches a 50% threshold. The public debt-to-GDP ratio was 81.0% when Orban's 50% target was set in 2011, and it is currently forecast to decline to 73.5% in 2016. In April 2013, Viktor Orbán further added that Hungarian purchasing power parity weighted GDP per capita must also reach 90% of the eurozone average. Shortly after Viktor Orbán had been re-elected as Prime Minister for another four-year term in April 2014, the Hungarian Central Bank announced they plan to distribute a new series of Forint bank notes in 2018. In June 2015, Orbán himself declared that his government would no longer entertain the idea of replacing the forint with the euro in 2020, as was previously suggested, and instead expected the forint to remain "stable and strong for the next several decades".

In July 2016, National Economy Minister Mihály Varga suggested that country could adopt the euro by the "end of the decade", but only if economic trends continue to improve and the common currency becomes more stable. While Varga backed away from that, saying convergence was still needed, Sándor Csányi (the head of the country's largest bank and ranked the second most influential man in Hungary) argued that further integration of the eurozone would provide a likely catalyst as Hungary would not want to be left out of closer integration. Attila Chikan, a professor of economics at Corvinus University, and a former economy minister to Orban, added that "Orban is at once very pragmatic and impulsive, he can make decisions very fast and sometimes on unexpected grounds."

Poland

The Polish government in 2012 under Prime Minister Donald Tusk had favoured euro adoption, however it did not have the required majority in the Sejm to amend the constitution due to the opposition of the Law and Justice Party to the euro. Further opposition arose due to the on-going sovereign-debt crisis, with the Polish National Bank recommending Poland wait until the Eurozone had overcome the crisis. The leader of the Law and Justice Party, Jaroslaw Kaczynski, stated in 2013 that "I do not foresee any moment when the adoption of the euro would be advantageous for us" and called for a referendum on euro adoption. Donald Tusk responded saying he was open to a referendum, as part of a package in Parliament to approve the constitutional amendment. However the 2015 Polish elections were won by Law and Justice who not only opposed any further moves towards membership, but whose relations with the EU degenerated due to a potential violation of EU values by Poland. A group of Polish economists have suggested that euro adoption could be a way of smoothing over relations from the dispute.

Polls have generally showed that Poles are opposed to adopting the euro straight away, with a eurobarometer poll in April 2015 showing that 44% of Polish people are in favour of introducing the euro (a decrease of 1% from 2014), whereas 53% are opposed (no change from 2014). However, polls conducted by TNS Polska throughout 2012–2015 have consistently shown support for eventually adopting the euro,

though that support depends on the target date. According to the latest TNS Polska poll from June 2015, the share who supported adoption was 46% against 41%. When asked about the appropriate timing, the supporters were divided into three groups of equal size, with 15% advocating for adoption within the next 5 years, another 14% preferring it should happen between 6–10 years from now, and finally 17% arguing it should happen more than 10 years from now.

Romania

Originally, the euro was scheduled to be adopted by Romania in place of the leu by 2014. In April 2012 the Romanian convergence report submitted under the Stability and Growth Pact listed 1 January 2015 to be the target date for euro adoption. In April 2013 Prime Minister Victor Ponta has stated that "eurozone entry remains a fundamental objective for Romania but we can't enter poorly prepared", and that 2020 was a more realistic target. The Romanian Central Bank governor, Mugur Isărescu, admitted the target was ambitious, but obtainable if the political parties passed a legal roadmap for the required reforms to be implemented, and clarified this roadmap should lead to Romania entering ERM II only on 1 January 2017 so the euro could be adopted after two years of ERM II membership on 1 January 2019.

As of April 2015, the Romanian government concluded it was still on track to attain its target for euro adoption in 2019, both in regards of ensuring full compliance with all nominal convergence criteria and in regards of ensuring a prior satisfying degree of "real convergence". The Romanian target for "real convergence" ahead of euro adoption, is for its GDP per capita (in purchasing power standards) to be above 60% of the same average figure for the entire European Union, and according to the latest outlook, this relative figure was now forecast to reach 65% in 2018 and 71% in 2020, after having risen at the same pace from 29% in 2002 to 54% in 2014. However, in September 2015 Romania's central bank governor Mugur Isarescu said that the 2019 target was no longer realistic. The target date was initially 2022, as Teodor Meleșcanu, the foreign minister of Romania declared on 28 August 2017 that, as they "meet all formal requirements", Romania "could join the currency union even tomorrow". However, he thought Romania "will adopt the euro in five years." In March 2018, however, members of the ruling Social Democratic Party (PSD) voted at an extraordinary congress to initially back a 2024 target year to adopt the euro as Romania's currency. But in February 2021, the country was scheduled to enter the eurozone [recte ERM II] instead in 2024, with the changeover to the euro delayed again to 2027 or 2028 and then again to 2029 in December 2021. An April 2022 Eurobarometer poll showed strong support for the Euro in Romania. According to the poll, 65 percent responded yes to the question "Do you think the introduction of the euro would have positive or negative consequences for Romania? (33 percent responded no). In the same poll, 77 percent responded yes to the question "Generally speaking, are you personally more in favour or against the idea of introducing the euro in Romania? (22 percent responded no).

Sweden

Although Sweden is required to replace the krona with the euro eventually, it maintains that joining the ERM II, a requirement for euro adoption, is voluntary, and has chosen to not join pending public approval by a referendum, thereby intentionally avoiding the fulfillment of the adoption requirements. On 14 September 2003 56% of Swedes voted against adopting the euro in a referendum. Most of Sweden's major parties believe that it would be in the national interest to join, but they have all pledged to abide by the result of the referendum. Former Prime Minister Fredrik Reinfeldt stated in December 2007 that there will be no referendum until there is stable support in the polls. The polls have generally showed stable support for the "no" alternative, except some polls in 2009 showing a support for "yes". Since 2010 the polls have shown strong support for "no" again. According to a eurobarometer poll in April 2015, 32% of Swedes are in favour of introducing the euro (an increase of 9% from November 2014), whereas 66% are opposed (a decrease of 7% from November 2014). An April 2022 Eurobarometer poll once again showed rising support for the Euro in Sweden, however. According to the poll, 49 percent answered yes to the question "Do you think the introduction of the euro would have positive or negative consequences for Sweden? (45 percent responded no). In the same poll, 45 percent responded yes to the question "Generally speaking, are you personally more in favour or against the idea of introducing the euro in Sweden? (52 percent responded no).

Outside the EU

The EU's position is that no independent sovereign state is allowed to join the eurozone without first being a full member of the European Union (EU). However, four independent sovereign European microstates situated within the borders of the eurozone states, have such a small size — rendering them unlikely ever to join the EU — that they have been allowed to adopt the euro through the signing of monetary agreements, which granted them rights to mint local euro coins without gaining a seat in the European Central Bank. In addition, some dependent territories of EU member states have also been allowed to use the euro without being part of the EU, conditional the signing of agreements where a eurozone state guarantee their prior adoption of regulations applying specifically for the eurozone.

Current adopters

European microstates

The European microstates of Monaco, San Marino and the Vatican City, which had a monetary agreement with a eurozone state when the euro was introduced, were granted a special permission to continue these agreements and to issue separate euro coins, but they don't get any input or observer status in the economic affairs of the eurozone. Andorra, which had used the euro unilaterally since the inception of the currency, negotiated a similar agreement which granted them the right to officially use the euro as of 1 April 2012 and to issue euro coins.

Kosovo and Montenegro

Kosovo and Montenegro have unilaterally adopted and used the euro since its launch, as they previously used the German mark rather than the Yugoslav dinar. This was due to political concerns that Serbia would use the currency to destabilise these provinces (Montenegro was then in a union with Serbia) so they received Western help in adopting and using the mark (though there was no restriction on the use of the dinar or any other currency). They switched to the euro when the mark was replaced, but have signed no monetary agreement with the ECB; rather the country depends only on euros already in circulation. Kosovo also still uses the Serbian dinar, which replaced the Yugoslav dinar, in areas mainly populated by the Serbian minority.

Potential adopters

Dutch overseas territories

Danish overseas territories
The Danish krone is currently used by both of its dependent territories, Greenland and Faroe Islands, with their monetary policy controlled by the Danish Central Bank. If Denmark does adopt the euro, separate referendums would be required in both territories to decide whether they should follow suit. Both territories have voted not to be a part of the EU in the past, and their populations will not participate in the Danish euro referendum. The Faroe Islands use a special version of the Danish krone notes that have been printed with text in the Faroese language. It is regarded as a foreign currency, but can be exchanged 1:1 with the Danish version. On 5 November 2009 the Faroese Parliament approved a proposal to investigate the possibility for euro adoption, including an evaluation of the legal and economic impact of adopting the euro ahead of Denmark.

French overseas territories
The CFP franc is currently used as a euro pegged currency by three French overseas collectivities: French Polynesia, Wallis and Futuna and New Caledonia. The French government has recommended that all three territories decide in favour of adopting the euro. French Polynesia has declared itself in favour of joining the eurozone. Wallis and Futuna announced a neutral standpoint, that they would support a currency choice similar to what New Caledonia chooses.

However, New Caledonia has yet to make a decision. Following an independence referendum held in November 2018, their opinion on whether or not to adopt the euro depended on the outcome. The result in 2018 was to stay with France, as confirmed later in 2020 and 2021 referendums.

If the three collectivities decide to adopt the euro, the French government would make an application on their behalf to the European Council, and the switch to the euro could be made after a couple of years. If the collectivities fail to reach a unanimous decision about the future of the CFP franc, it would be technically possible to implement an individual currency decision for each territory.

Northern Cyprus

Northern Cyprus is legally part of the EU, but European law is suspended due to the region being under the control of the Turkish Republic of Northern Cyprus, which the EU does not recognise. The North uses the Turkish lira instead of the euro, although the euro circulates alongside the lira and other currencies. If the Cyprus dispute is resolved in a manner that results in a single Cypriot state rather than formal acceptance of the status quo, the euro would become the currency of the whole island.

As a consequence of the ongoing Turkish currency crisis, some Northern Cypriot economists are calling for the region to adopt the euro to curb the high inflation and switch to a stable currency.

Past debates

Iceland
During the 2008–2011 Icelandic financial crisis, instability in the króna led to discussion in Iceland about adopting the euro. However, Jürgen Stark, a Member of the executive board of the European Central Bank, has stated that "Iceland would not be able to adopt the EU currency without first becoming a member of the EU". Iceland subsequently applied for EU membership. As of the ECB's May 2012 convergence report, Iceland did not meet any of the convergence criteria. One year later, the country had achieved compliance with the deficit criteria and had begun to decrease its debt-to-GDP ratio, but still suffered from elevated HICP inflation and long-term governmental interest rates. On 13 September 2013, a newly elected government dissolved the accession negotiation team and thus suspended Iceland's application to join the European Union until a referendum can be held on whether or not the accession negotiations should resume; if negotiations do resume, after they are completed the public will then have the opportunity in a second referendum to vote on "whether or not Iceland shall join the EU on the negotiated terms".

United Kingdom

Before Brexit, the potential adoption of the euro was part of public discourse in the UK. Ultimately, the country did not seek to adopt the currency, and following Brexit, the topic is no longer part of public discourse.

While not an official currency in Gibraltar, most retail outlets there do accept the euro.

Public opinion
Public support for the euro in states that have joined the EU since 2004

See also
 Withdrawal from the eurozone
 Enlargement of the European Union
 History of the European Union

Notes

References

Politics of the European Union
Eurozone
Eurozone